Hampus Eriksson (born September 11, 1996) is a Swedish ice hockey player. He is currently playing with Brynäs IF of the Swedish Hockey League (SHL).

Eriksson made his Swedish Hockey League debut playing with Brynäs IF during the 2014–15 SHL season.

References

External links

1996 births
Living people
Brynäs IF players
Lake Superior State Lakers men's ice hockey players
Swedish ice hockey forwards
People from Gävle
Sportspeople from Gävleborg County